Yagoam is a town in the Ramongo Department of Boulkiemdé Province in central western Burkina Faso. It has a population of 1,241.

References

Populated places in Boulkiemdé Province